Braz or Bráz may refer to:

Adam Braz (born 1981), Canadian soccer player and Technical Director of the Montreal Impact of Major League Soccer
David Braz (born 1987), Brazilian footballer 
Bráz (João Francisco Bráz) (1920–1996), Brazilian basketball player
 Loalwa Braz (1953–2017), Brazilian singer and songwriter
Osip Braz (1873–1936), Russian-Jewish realist painter
Thiago Braz (born 1993), Brazilian pole vaulter